Standish Community High School – known locally as Standish High – is a coeducational secondary school located in Standish in the Metropolitan Borough of Wigan, Greater Manchester, England.

The school has approximately 1,250 students aged 11–16 in Key Stages 3 & 4 and has specialisms in Languages, Maths and Computing. The current headteacher is Mrs Lindsey Barker, who took over the position from Andrew Pollard in 2018.

It teaches the following subjects to GCSE level: English, Maths, Science and Triple Science, Art, Photography, Music, Drama, Media, MFL (including French and Spanish), Technology, Physical Education, Religious Education, History, Geography, Computer Science and ICT.

History 
The school was founded in 1978. It began a major building and remodelling programme in 1989, and in 1992 opened up new facilities for science, art, and design technology. Standish Community High School has been a Language College since 1996. It has a replica continental high-street in the Languages department, complete with shops, stalls and a bank, which can be used as part of teaching and learning or can be booked‐out by other schools and colleges. In 2018, the school became part of a multi-academy trust in partnership with Southlands High School, after plans were approved by the Department for Education.

The school is known in the region for their consistent good grades, achieving 86% A*–C grades in 2011 including Maths and English subjects.. The school is also very well known in the Wigan Borough due to outstanding Ofsted reports which describe the school as "a good school", with some "outstanding" features such as safeguarding.

Previously a community school administered by Wigan Metropolitan Borough Council, in December 2017 Standish Community High School converted to academy status. The school is now sponsored by the Mosaic Academy Trust.

Sport 
Standish Community High School has many successful sports teams consisting of: football, rugby, badminton, table tennis, cheerleading, netball and basketball. The school's cheerleading team 'Standish Allstars' has been 2 x UKCA Schools Streetcheer champions, in 2010 and 2011. The team won 2nd Place in UKCA Schools KS4 Advanced Cheerleading in the same two years.  They also took the 1st place at Streetcheer Nationals at Fenton Manor in November 2010. The elite stunt group took 7th Place in the European Cheerleading Championships held in Slovenia on the 2nd–3 July 2011. . In addition to in-school sports, a number of the school's students progress into professional sporting roles with local football and rugby teams as well as a small number of students going on to represent Great Britain in events such as swimming. Wigan Warriors player, Logan Tomkins attended the school. Recently Matthew Ashcroft has gained a scholarship for England Rugby League. 
In rugby union, Rory Brand progressed from Standish CHS to Wellington College, Berkshire as the inaugural recipient of the Jimmy Higham Scholarship and so far has been capped at U17 and U18 for England Rugby and plays for London Irish Academy.

Headteachers 

Mrs Lindsey Barker (2018–)

Mr Andrew Pollard (2014–2018)

Mrs Lynne Fox (2010–2014)

Mr Hugh Crossan(2005–2010)

Mr Geoff Ashton (1981–2005)

Mr Martin Buttler (1978–1981)

Other information 
The school provides pastoral care, possessing its own unit dedicated to helping students with everything from anger management to bereavement, whilst also providing support for students with recognised learning difficulties. The school is currently working towards becoming a recognised dyslexia-friendly establishment.

References

External links

Secondary schools in the Metropolitan Borough of Wigan
Academies in the Metropolitan Borough of Wigan
Standish, Greater Manchester
Educational institutions established in 1978
1978 establishments in England